The 1967 Arab League summit was held on August 29 in Khartoum as the fourth Arab League Summit in the aftermath of the Arab defeat by Israel in the Six-Day War, and is famous for its Khartoum Resolution known as "The Three No's"; No peace with Israel, no recognition of Israel, no negotiations with Israel.  The summit also resolved that the "oil-rich Arab states" give financial aid to the states who lost the war and to "help them rebuild their military forces." The final communique of the meeting "underscored the Palestinians' right to regain the whole of Palestine—that is, to destroy the State of Israel." The outcome of this summit influenced Israeli foreign policy for decades.

References

1967 Arab League summit
Arab–Israeli conflict
1967 in politics
Diplomatic conferences in Sudan
20th-century diplomatic conferences
History of Khartoum
1967 in Sudan
1967 in international relations
August 1967 events in Africa
1967 conferences